Glaciologist Bay is an ice-filled bay about  long in the southwest part of the Jelbart Ice Shelf along the coast of Queen Maud Land, Antarctica. It was mapped by Norwegian cartographers from surveys and air photos by Norwegian–British–Swedish Antarctic Expedition (1949–52) and named "Glasiologbukta" (the glaciologist bay).

References

Bays of Queen Maud Land
Princess Astrid Coast